BISG could refer to: 

Book Industry Strategy Group, Australian governmental initiative
Book Industry Study Group, American publishing trade organization
Belt-Driven Integrated Starter Generator or Belt Mounted Integrated Starter Generator, alternate terms for a BAS hybrid